Aibahama Park (藍場浜公園) is a park in Aiba-cho in Tokushima City in Tokushima Prefecture.

Overview 
Found alongside the Shinmachi River that winds its way through the middle of Tokushima City, the Aibahama Park grounds are known as a popular place for events. In April there is the Hana Haru Festa,  and the grounds are also used for one of the dancing stages in Awa Odori held during O-bon. Aibahama Park is also used during the local Awa no Tanuki Festival in November each year, and is the permanent home for the Tokushima Arts Foundation for Culture. 

 Local buildings / facilities - Tokushima Sogo、Tokushima CITY、Poppo-gai、Tokushima Press

Facilities on the grounds 
 The Tokushima Arts Foundation for Culture
 The Shinmachi River

Access 
 Five minutes walk from the JR Tokushima Station and bus terminal area.

External links 
 Tokushima City, Aibahama Park

Parks in Japan
Parks and gardens in Tokushima Prefecture